Radisson is a town in the province of Saskatchewan, Canada. It was named after Pierre-Esprit Radisson (1636–1710), an explorer who was instrumental in the creation of Hudson's Bay Company.

Former NHL player Bill Hajt was born in Radisson.

Demographics 

Transportation
The community is served by Radisson Airport which is located adjacent to Radisson.

Climate

See also 

 List of communities in Saskatchewan
 List of towns in Saskatchewan

References

External links

Towns in Saskatchewan
Division No. 16, Saskatchewan